Dracula's Guest is a short story by Bram Stoker, first published in the short story collection Dracula's Guest and Other Weird Stories (1914). It is believed to be the first chapter for Stoker's 1897 novel Dracula, but was deleted prior to publication as the original publishers felt it was superfluous to the story.

Plot summary 

"Dracula's Guest" follows an Englishman (whose name is never mentioned, but is presumed to be Jonathan Harker) on a visit to Munich before leaving for Transylvania. It is Walpurgis Night, and in spite of the hotelier's warning to not return late, the young man later leaves his carriage and wanders toward the direction of an abandoned "unholy" village. As the carriage departs with the frightened and superstitious driver, a tall and thin stranger scares the horses at the crest of a hill.

After a few hours, as he reaches a desolate valley, it begins to snow; as a dark storm gathers intensity, the Englishman takes shelter in a grove of cypress and yew trees. The Englishman's location is soon illuminated by moonlight to be a cemetery, and he finds himself before a marble tomb with a large iron stake driven through the roof, the inscription reads: "Countess Dolingen of Gratz / in Styria / sought and found death / 1801". 
The Englishman is disturbed to be in such a place on such a night and as the storm breaks anew, he is forced by pelting hail to shelter in the doorway of the tomb. As he does so, the bronze door of the tomb opens under his weight and a flash of forked lightning shows the interior, revealing a "beautiful woman with rounded cheeks and red lips, seemingly sleeping on a bier". The force of the following thunder peal throws the Englishman from the doorway (experienced as "being grasped as by the hand of a giant") as another lightning bolt strikes the iron spike, destroying the tomb and the now screaming woman inside.

The Englishman's troubles are not quite over, as he painfully regains his senses from the ordeal, he is repulsed by a feeling of loathing which he connects to a warm feeling in his chest and a licking at this throat. The Englishman summons courage to peek through his eyelashes and discovers a gigantic wolf with flaming eyes is attending him.

Military horsemen are the next to wake the semi-conscious man, chasing the wolf away with torches and guns. Some horsemen return to the main party and the Englishman after the chase, reporting that they had not found 'him' and that the Englishman's animal is "a wolf—and yet not a wolf".
They also note that blood is on the ruined tomb, yet the Englishman's neck is unbloodied. "See comrades, the wolf has been lying on him and keeping his blood warm". Later, the Englishman finds his neck pained when a horseman comments on it.

When the Englishman is taken back to his hotel by the men, he is informed that it is none other than his expectant host Count Dracula that has alerted the Maître d'hôtel of "dangers from snow and wolves and night" in a telegram during the time the Englishman was away.

Context 

It is widely believed that "Dracula's Guest" is actually the deleted first chapter from the original Dracula manuscript, which the publisher felt was superfluous to the story. In the preface to the original edition of Dracula's Guest and Other Weird Stories, Stoker's widow Florence wrote, "To his original list of stories in this book, I have added an hitherto unpublished episode from Dracula. It was originally excised owing to the length of the book, and may prove of interest to the many readers of what is considered my husband's most remarkable work."

Leslie S. Klinger, who had access to Stoker's original Dracula manuscript while researching his 2008 book The New Annotated Dracula, saw evidence of "Dracula's Guest" having been deleted from the manuscript, such as a deleted sentence of Harker commenting that his throat is "still sore from the licking of the gray wolf's file-like tongue" and the first and second chapters of the finished novel being labeled in the manuscript as "ii" and "iii". Klinger ultimately concludes the following:

Further deleted sentences from Harker include the mention of his "adventures in Munich" in a conversation with Dracula. Also the "fair women" of the female vampires reminds him of the woman he "had seen in the tomb of Walpurgis Night".

The Swedish scholar Rickard Berghorn noted that the description of the  countess in Dracula's Guest closely resembled the description of the female Vampire in the Powers of Darkness, which he used to argue that the blonde vampire in Dracula's Guest was her.

Inspirations 

The inscription on the tomb is now recognised as being a tribute to Joseph Sheridan Le Fanu, one of Stoker's fellow predecessor in terms of vampire writing. Sheridan Le Fanu's Carmilla (1872) deals with a protagonist showing resemblances with Countess Dolingen. Carmilla'''s main protagonist is ultimately revealed to be Countess Millarca Karnestein, a vampire. Inscribed on the back of the tomb, graven in great Russian letters, is: "The dead travel fast", which was an ode to the fable "Lenore".

Some experts believe the deleted opening was based on the Austrian princess Eleonore von Schwarzenberg, as discussed in the TV documentary Vampire Princess.

 Adaptations 

David O. Selznick bought the film rights to "Dracula's Guest" and later re-sold them to Universal Studios. Universal's film Dracula's Daughter (1936) was ostensibly based on the story, although it uses nothing from the plot.Dracula: The Lady in the Tomb (1991) was an adaptation of "Dracula's Guest" written by Steven Philip Jones, drawn by Robert Schneiders, and published by Eternity Comics.  The year before Eternity published an adaptation of "Dracula" by Jones, Schneiders, and Craig Taillefer.  In 2014 Caliber Comics collected these adaptations into a single graphic novel titled "Dracula."
 Dracula was adapted as a five-part comic book miniseries from Dynamite Entertainment. The miniseries, titled The Complete Dracula (2009), incorporates "Dracula's Guest" into the story.
 Robot Comics published a comic book adaptation by Stephen Antczak, James Bassett, and Steven Sanders in 2010.
 Textbook Stuff published an unabridged audio reading of the story in 2010, alongside "The Judge's House" and "A Gypsy Prophecy". It was read by Peter Guinness.
 Booktrack published a soundtracked eBook version in 2015.
Indian radio adaptation:-
Radio Mirchi Kolkata a radio station based in eastern part of India Kolkata started a Dracula series adapting Bram stroker's Dracula starting with Dracula 's guest as their first story

References

 Sources 
 Klinger, Leslie S. (2008) The New Annotated Dracula. W.W. Norton & Co.. .
 Skal, David J. (1993). The Monster Show: A Cultural History of Horror. Penguin Books. .
  Stoker, Bram, Eighteen-Bisang, Robert and Miller, Elizabeth (2008) Bram Stoker's Notes for Dracula: A Facsimile Edition''. McFarland. .

External links 

Documentary "The Vampire Princess", written and directed by Klaus T. Steindl (2007)

1914 short stories
Dracula
Horror short stories
Short stories published posthumously
Walpurgis Night fiction
Werewolf written fiction
Works by Bram Stoker